Earl Richmond Jr. (November 6, 1961 – May 6, 2005) was an American serial killer who committed four murders, including those of two children, in New Jersey and North Carolina in 1991. Before the murders, Richmond served in the United States Army as a drill sergeant, stationed at Fort Dix in New Jersey, where he committed two known rapes. Following his arrest for murder, he was sentenced to death and executed by lethal injection in 2005.

Early life 
Earl Richmond Jr. was born on November 6, 1961, in Fayetteville, North Carolina. Ultimately, not much is known about his childhood and adolescent years, but he entered the military in his early adult years. Between 1988 and 1990, Richmond served as a drill sergeant at Fort Dix in Trenton, New Jersey.

Crimes

Military crimes 
During his time in the army, multiple sexual assaults on female recruits were reported in the immediate area. The first of which occurred on April 15, 1989, when a female Air Force trainee was sexually assaulted at gunpoint at a bus stop. Days later, a 17-year-old girl was raped in her motel room just outside of Fort Dix. A man named Richard Stevens was arrested and convicted of the first assault by a federal court, but his conviction was overturned three years later after it was proven that Stevens was most likely innocent. In 1990, Richmond was sanctioned over misconduct and subsequently discharged.

On April 5, 1991, Richmond entered the home of 24-year-old Lisa Ann Nadeau, an Army Specialist based out of Fort Dix, as well as a payroll clerk, from Plainfield, Connecticut. Richmond tied up, strangled, stabbed, and beat Nadeau to death with a hammer. He was not suspected in her murder, but afterward, Richmond traveled to North Carolina.

Murder of the Hayes family 
Richmond began staying with 27-year-old Helisa Hayes and her two children, 8-year-old Philip and 7-year-old Darien. Richmond was a family friend of Hayes, as he had dated one of Hayes' sisters, and was a friend of Hayes' ex-husband, Wayne. On November 2, after apparently getting into an argument, Richmond dragged Hayes into the bedroom where he raped her. Afterward, he forced Philip into the bathroom where he stabbed him 40 times with a pair of scissors, and strangled him with an electrical cord before he strangled Darien with a wire from a curling iron. The bodies were discovered on November 4 by Hayes' father. Police initially focused on Wayne Hayes, Helisa's ex-husband.

Arrest and convictions 
It was not until April 1992 that Richmond would become a suspect, and he was brought into the police station for an interview on April 3. During which, he denied involvement. At the same time, a DNA test was brought forward, which confirmed Richmond's involvement. Upon learning this, Richmond confessed to the murders. At the same time, DNA testing also connected Richmond to the two unsolved rapes that occurred in at Ford Dix in 1989, as well as the murder of Nadeau. Richmond confessed to each of the murders and told officers he intentionally left behind evidence because he wanted to get caught. Richmond was tried in federal court for Nadeau's murder since it occurred on a military base. He was convicted in May 1993 and sentenced to life imprisonment. In May 1995, Richmond was convicted of the Hayes' murders and sentenced to death.

Execution 
On May 6, 2005, Richmond was executed by lethal injection at Central Prison in Raleigh, North Carolina. He declined a last meal. Richmond's last words were "I'd like to extend my deepest apologies to all the victims' families and their loved ones. I'd like to say that I'm not a man that shies away from his responsibilities. I'd like to say that I hope that now, through my death, that y'all can move forward with your lives. Thank you and God bless you."

See also 
 Capital punishment in North Carolina
 Capital punishment in the United States
 List of people executed in North Carolina
 List of people executed in the United States in 2005
 List of serial killers in the United States

References 

1961 births
2005 deaths
20th-century American criminals
21st-century executions of American people
21st-century executions by North Carolina
American people convicted of rape
Criminals from North Carolina
Executed American serial killers
Executed people from North Carolina
People convicted of murder by North Carolina
People executed by North Carolina by lethal injection
People from Fayetteville, North Carolina